Interrupting Chicken is a 2010 children's picture book written and illustrated by David Ezra Stein and published by Candlewick Press. Interrupting Chicken was awarded the 2011 Caldecott Honor and a New York Times Bestseller. The book was followed by two sequels Interrupting Chicken and the Elephant of Surprise (2018) and Interrupting Chicken: Cookies for Breakfast (2021). An animated series adaptation of the book was released on Apple TV+ on November 18, 2022. The series features the voice of Sterling K. Brown as Papa and Juliet Donenfeld as Piper. A holiday special was released on December 2, 2022.

Characters
Little Red Chicken is portrayed to be quite young, very enthusiastic and energetic considering this book is based at night. She is very involved with the stories and wants what is best for the characters. She is unable to rest while being read to but does seem to appreciate her father. In the animated series, her name is Piper.

Papa is Little Red Chicken's father who proves to be very patient and forgiving. He seems to be quite tired throughout the story and wishes Little Red Chicken would go to bed so he could get some rest also.

Author

David Ezra Stein was born in Brooklyn, New York. When designing the chickens for Interrupting Chicken, Stein said he did “a hundred different drawings of the chicken” before he decided which one he liked the most. His books have been translated in Chinese, Korean, Japanese, Spanish, French and Finnish. He attended the School of Design in Manhattan.  Stein's idea behind Interrupting Chicken came from a childhood knock knock joke that he enjoyed.

References

2010 children's books
American picture books
Books about birds
Caldecott Honor-winning works
Candlewick Press books
Children's books adapted into television shows